Ovidiu Bistriceanu, known professionally as Ovi, is a Romanian-Canadian songwriter and producer, best known for his dance-pop productions, urban and pop-rock. His collaborations include singer Mia Martina for Burning which peaked at #8 on Billboard Canadian CHR Top 40 Chart and #25 on the Billboard Canadian Hot 100 Chart, and Massari for Brand New Day which charted in several countries including Canada, Germany, Hungary and Austria. He has also worked with several other artists and musicians including French Montana, Elena Gheorghe, Andreea Bănică, Mozhdah and Nat Jay.

Awards 

In 2014, Ovi was awarded the SOCAN Songwriting Prize for Burning in the category Pop/Rock Music. Music Canada awarded him three Golden Records for his work on Burning in 2012 and Brand New Day and Shisha in 2016.

Discography

References

External links 

 Ovi discography at Discogs
 Ovi discography at AllMusic

People from Năvodari
Year of birth missing (living people)
Living people